"The Orange and the Green" or "The Biggest Mix-Up" is a humorous Irish folk song about a man whose father was a Protestant ("Orange") and whose mother was a Catholic ("Green"). It describes the man's trials as the product of religious intermarriage and how "mixed up" he became as a result of such an upbringing.

This song was written by Anthony Murphy of Liverpool, and has been recorded by bands such as The Irish Rovers, The Wolfe Tones, Paddy Reilly, the Brobdingnagian Bards, Marc Gunn, and The Spinners and among others. It is sung to the same tune as "The Wearing of the Green", which is also used in "The Rising of the Moon", another Irish ballad.

History
Liverpool, home to a great many Irish immigrants, has a large number of Catholics. On the other hand, the Protestant Orange Order is also very strong. The Orange Lodge marches every year in July, with bands of fifes, drums and bagpipes, to celebrate the victory of Protestant King William of Orange over Catholic King James II, on 12 July 1690.

See also
Protestantism in Ireland
Roman Catholicism in Ireland
The Troubles

Religious pluralism
Irish folk songs
Songs about The Troubles (Northern Ireland)
Year of song missing
Interfaith marriage